Eleutherostylis is a monotypic genus of flowering plants belonging to the family Malvaceae. It only contains one species, Eleutherostylis renistipulata Burret. It is within the Grewioideae subfamily.

It is native to New Guinea.

The genus name of Eleutherostylis is derived from the Greek Eleutheria meaning free and also stylus meaning style.
The Latin specific epithet of renistipulata is a combination of two words, reni meaning kidney-shaped, from renes, and stipule, a small appendage at the base of leaves.
It was first described and published in Notizbl. Bot. Gart. Berlin-Dahlem Vol.9 on page 629 in 1926.

References

Grewioideae
Malvaceae genera
Monotypic Malvales genera
Plants described in 1926
Flora of New Guinea
Taxa named by Max Burret